Mark Hsu Syers (25 October 195215 May 1983) was a Broadway actor in the 70s and 80s.  He graduated from Hopewell Valley Central High School and attended the University of New Mexico, where he acted in The Fantasticks. He graduated Emerson College in 1974 in Boston.  He also appeared in Under Fire in New York City and Godspell in Boston.  His first major role was in Pacific Overtures where he played, among other roles, the Russian Admiral ("Please Hello"), the Soothsayer ("Chrysanthemum Tea"), the Thief ("Four Black Dragons"), and the Warrior ("Someone in a Tree"). He played King Herod in Jesus Christ Superstar and Magaldi in Evita. His voice can be heard on the cast recordings of Pacific Overtures  and Evita.  He was featured in the television program "Anatomy of a Song: Someone in a Tree" with Stephen Sondheim, Gedde Watanabe and James Dybas, which was presented by Frank Rich.

He died in a head-on car crash in Pennington, New Jersey on a wet road in 1983, at the age of 30.  He is buried in Ewing Cemetery.

References

1952 births
1983 deaths
Hopewell Valley Central High School alumni
People from Trenton, New Jersey
20th-century American male actors
American male musical theatre actors
Emerson College alumni
20th-century American singers
Road incident deaths in New Jersey
Burials in New Jersey
20th-century American male singers